Antaeotricha albovenosa is a moth in the family Depressariidae. It was described by Zeller in 1877. It is found in Peru.

References

Moths described in 1877
albovenosa
Moths of South America